Mario Pietruzzi (16 June 1918 – 5 November 2014) was an Italian professional footballer and manager.

Career

Footballer

As a footballer, he played for all of his career with Alessandria. He became the third player to play most matches with the team.

He gained a promotion in Serie A in 1945–46, winning a Serie B championship, and a promotion in Serie B in 1953.

Coach

As a coach, he managed Derthona and Valenzana. He managed even Alessandria for two seasons and, in the 1970s, he signed twice as a caretaker.

References

1918 births
2014 deaths
People from Alessandria
Italian footballers
Serie A players
Serie B players
Italian football managers
U.S. Alessandria Calcio 1912 players
U.S. Alessandria Calcio 1912 managers
A.S.D. HSL Derthona managers
Association football forwards
Association football midfielders
Footballers from Piedmont
Sportspeople from the Province of Alessandria